Disharmony: Break Out is the second extended play by South Korean boy band P1Harmony. It was released by FNC Entertainment under license to Kakao Entertainment on April 20, 2021, including the lead single "Scared". It is the second mini-album of P1Harmony's Disharmony series.

Composition 
All members participated in composing the lyrics of the final track, "If You Call Me".

Commercial performance 
The EP debuted at number six on the Gaon Album Chart and had sold 67,150 copies by June 2021.

Track listing

Charts

References 

2021 EPs
FNC Entertainment EPs
Korean-language EPs
P1Harmony EPs